The B. F. Grady School was a historic school building located near Kornegay, Duplin County, North Carolina.  It was designed by architect Leslie N. Boney, Sr. and built in 1928.  It was a two-story, 27 bay wide, Neoclassical style brick building.  Wings were added in 1938, 1947, and 1950.

It was listed on the National Register of Historic Places in 1994 and remains listed in 2012.  However, the building was destroyed in April, 1996. In 2022, Andrew Wilson was selected as Duplin County Teacher of the Year. He teaches 5th grade is the first BFG teacher to ever win the award.

References

School buildings on the National Register of Historic Places in North Carolina
Neoclassical architecture in North Carolina
School buildings completed in 1928
Buildings and structures in Duplin County, North Carolina
National Register of Historic Places in Duplin County, North Carolina
1928 establishments in North Carolina